I Like Ike! The Best of Ike Turner is a compilation album released by Rhino Records in 1994. The album spotlights musician Ike Turner's work as a bandleader, pianist, guitarist, and solo artist, "concentrating heavily on his work in the 1950s and early '60s."

Content 
I Like Ike! The Best Of Ike Turner was released a year after the biopic What's Love Got to Do with It where Turner was portrayed negatively, resulting in intense media scrutiny. The album highlights Turner's musical contributions, featuring original recordings of his work with various featured vocalist and accompanying musicians, beginning with "Rocket 88" in 1951 up until "You're Still My Baby" from Turner's 1972 album Blues Roots. The album also contains Tina Turner's first recording "Boxtop," released in 1958.

The song "Takin' Back My Name," originally released by Turner as a non-album track in 1970, was later used for the title of his 1999 autobiography.

Critical reception 

Reviewing the album in Christgau's Consumer Guide: Albums of the '90s, Robert Christgau wrote: Hardly the last major rock and roller to brutalize women, Turner gets short-changed by history partly because his best-known victim was so major herself and partly because his specialty was collaboration. Sadly, Rhino's licensing whizzes failed to secure his Federal sides, depriving us of both his rawest singer  — Billy Gayles, the real Screamin' Jay Hawkins  — and his most primordial guitar. And leaving a lean, mean bandleader whose ear for the permanent novelty only began with "Rocket '88'" – as did everything else.

Track listing 
All tracks written by Ike Turner except where noted.

References 

1994 compilation albums
Ike Turner albums
Albums produced by Ike Turner
Rhino Records compilation albums
Rock-and-roll albums